Terrabella Parish  is a civil parish of Gordon County, New South Wales. a Cadastral divisions of New South Wales.

The  parish is on the Macquarie River and Little River Creek, midway between Dubbo and Wellington, New South Wales. the nearest town. The Murrumbidoera falls are in the parish and the Molong–Dubbo railway line passes through the parish.

References

Parishes of Gordon County (New South Wales)